Podslon is a village in the municipality of Dobrichka, in Dobrich Province, in northeastern Bulgaria. It was formerly known as Kuydzhuk.

References

Villages in Dobrich Province